The 2015 China International Suzhou was a professional tennis tournament played on hard courts. It was the first edition of the tournament, which was part of the 2015 ATP Challenger Tour. It took place in Suzhou, China from October 26 to November 1, 2015.

Singles main-draw entrants

Seeds 

 Rankings are as of October 19, 2015.

Other entrants 
The following players received wildcards into the singles main draw:
  He Yecong
  Yuqing Ning
  Gao Xin
  Zhang Zhizhen

The following players received entry from the qualifying draw:
  Zhaoyi Cao
  Laurent Rochette
  Sun Fajing
  Sheng Hao Zhou

Champions

Singles 

  Dudi Sela def.  Matija Pecotić 6–1, 1–0 retired

Doubles 

  Lee Hsin-han /  Denys Molchanov def.  Gong Maoxin /  Peng Hsien-yin 3–6, 7–6(7–5), [10–4]

China International Suzhou
2015 in Chinese tennis